Frank Henry Buck (September 23, 1887 – September 17, 1942) was an American heir, businessman and politician. He served as U.S. Representative from California from 1933 to 1942.

Biography

Early life
Frank Buck was born on a ranch near Vacaville, California on September 23, 1887. His grandfather, Leonard W. Buck, was the founder of the Buck Company, a fruit-growing company, who had been elected to the California State Senate in 1895. He attended the public schools. He was a member of the Theta Delta Chi fraternity, and graduated from the University of California at Berkeley in 1908 and from the law department of Harvard University in 1911. He was admitted to the bar the same year and commenced practice in San Francisco, California.

Business
He was involved in business ventures including fruit growing, oil refining, and lumber, partly thanks to his inheritance.

In 1900, together with Burton E. Green (1868-1965), Charles A. Canfield (1848-1913), Max Whittier (1867–1928), William F. Herrin (1854-1927), Henry E. Huntington (1850-1927), William G. Kerckhoff (1856–1929), W.S. Porter and Frank H. Balch, known as the Amalgamated Oil Company, he purchased Rancho Rodeo de las Aguas from Henry Hammel and Andrew H. Denker and renamed it Morocco Junction. After drilling for oil and only finding water, they reorganized their business into the Rodeo Land and Water Company to develop a new residential town later known as Beverly Hills, California. Addendum: This purchase could not have been made by 13 year old Frank H. Buck Jr. It must refer to Frank H. Buck Sr, his father.  Frank H. Buck (Sr) married Anna Stevenson in 1886, and their first son, Frank H Buck Jr was born the following year. Frank H. Buck (Sr) was the son of Leonard W Buck (1834-1895) and Anna Bellows Buck. (This info is based on "History of the State of California and Biographical Record of coast counties...by James Miller Guinn, p. 348-349.Google EBook.)

He became the leader of the newly founded California Grower's and Shipper's Protective League, a lobbying organization to protect the rights of fruit and vegetable growers. In 1933, he sold the Buck Company, his grandfather's company, to the Pacific Fruit Exchange.

Politics
He served as delegate to the Democratic National Conventions in 1928, 1936, and 1940. In 1932, he was elected as a Democrat to the U.S. House of Representatives. He served in Congress from March 4, 1933, until his death in Washington, D.C. on September 17, 1942. He is credited with naming the Social Security program.

Personal life
He married Zayda Zabriskie (daughter of Christian Brevoort Zabriskie) in 1911 and they had four children, Frank Henry Buck III (1912-1993), Margaret Ann Buck(1913-), Christian Brevoort Zabriskie Buck (1914-1995) and Edward Zabriskie Elvis Buck (1917-1964). After they divorced, he married Eva Mathilde Benson in 1926, and they had two children, William Benson Buck and Carol Franc Buck (1936-). He died on September 17, 1942, while still in office.

He was interred in Vacaville-Elmira Cemetery, in Vacaville, California. His wife, Eva Benson Buck, founded the Frank H. Buck Scholarship, which is awarded each year to eight to 16 high school seniors, who have to live in his former congressional district. She was an active philanthropist until her death in 1990.

See also
 List of United States Congress members who died in office (1900–49)

References

1887 births
1942 deaths
People from Vacaville, California
Businesspeople from San Francisco
People from Beverly Hills, California
University of California, Berkeley alumni
Harvard Law School alumni
Democratic Party members of the United States House of Representatives from California
American Presbyterians
Politicians from San Francisco
20th-century American politicians
20th-century American businesspeople